Bradley Maurice Charles Woods-Garness (born 27 June 1986) is an English-born Montserratian footballer who plays as a striker or winger.

He has been capped internationally for Montserrat.

Career

Club career
As a youth he started out at Chelsea and then Wycombe Wanderers before joining Barnet, playing twice for the first team in the Football League Trophy and Conference League Cup, before establishing himself as a goalscorer, initially at Welwyn Garden City where he was top scorer in the 2005–2006 season, and then at Farnborough, Billericay Town, Sutton United and Canvey Island.

After leaving Lowestoft Town at the end of the 2015–16 season, Woods-Garness started the 2016–17 season at Bishop's Stortford, followed by a number of brief spells at Cray Wanderers, Cambridge City, Chalfont St Peter, and Ware. He finished the season at Whitehawk. On 12 August 2017 he featured for Bedford Town in the Southern League Division One East season opener. Woods-Garnes joined Wingate & Finchley in January 2020.

International career

Woods-Garness was called up to the Montserrat national football team in August 2012, for the 2012 Caribbean Championship First Round qualifiers, held in Martinique. He helped Montserrat achieve their first victory since 1995 and their first ever victory since joining FIFA, beating the British Virgin Islands 7–0. He became Montserrat's joint-record scorer on 22 March 2019, with 4 goals, after scoring the winner in a 2019–20 CONCACAF Nations League qualification game against Cayman Islands.

Woods-Garness also represented England at schoolboy level.

International goals
Scores and results list Montserrat's goal tally first.

Personal life
Woods-Garness was educated at Highbury Grove School (1997–2002) and Southgate College (2002–2004). He works as a residential carer for young people aged 16+.

While playing for Sutton United in June 2011, Woods-Garness was arrested and spent six months in prison awaiting trial for allegedly intimidating a witness in a murder trial, in an incident that also involved the then Leyton Orient defender Elliot Omozusi. He was eventually found not guilty and returned to play for Sutton United, having always enjoyed the full support of manager Paul Doswell.

Woods-Garness is also a frequent guest on 'No Behaviour Podcast' hosted by ex rapper Margs and Loons.

Honours
Sutton United
Isthmian League: Winner 2010-2011
Lowestoft Town 
Isthmian League: Play-Off Winner 2013-2014

References

External links
 Lowestoft Town FC profile

Living people
1986 births
English footballers
Montserratian footballers
Montserrat international footballers
Montserratian expatriate footballers
Association football forwards
Canvey Island F.C. players
Isthmian League players
Black British sportspeople
English people of Montserratian descent
Lowestoft Town F.C. players
Billericay Town F.C. players
Sutton United F.C. players
Dartford F.C. players
Farnborough F.C. players
Welwyn Garden City F.C. players
Wycombe Wanderers F.C. players
Barnet F.C. players
England youth international footballers
Cray Wanderers F.C. players
Cambridge City F.C. players
Whitehawk F.C. players
Tonbridge Angels F.C. players
Chalfont St Peter A.F.C. players
Ware F.C. players
Bedford Town F.C. players
Wingate & Finchley F.C. players